The 2013 European Curling Championships were held from November 22 to 30 at the Sørmarka Arena in Stavanger, Norway. Norway last hosted the European Curling Championships in 1990. The Group C competitions were held in October at the Tårnby Curling Club in Tårnby, Denmark.

At the conclusion of the championships, the top eight women's teams advanced to the 2014 Ford World Women's Curling Championship, and the top eight men's teams advanced to the 2014 World Men's Curling Championship.

Men

Group A
The Group A competitions were contested in Stavanger.

Round-robin standings
Final round-robin standings

Playoffs

Bronze-medal game
Saturday, November 30, 10:00

Final
Saturday, November 30, 15:00

Group B
The Group B competitions were contested in Stavanger.

Round-robin standings
Final round-robin standings

Playoffs

Bronze-medal game
Friday, November 29, 12:00

Final
Friday, November 29, 12:00

Group C
The Group C competitions were contested in Tårnby. Eight men's teams competed for two berths to the Group B competitions in Stavanger. The teams played a single round robin, and at its conclusion, the top four teams advanced to the playoffs, which were held in a format similar to that of the World Wheelchair Curling Championship qualification events. Wales and Romania advanced to the Group B competitions in Stavanger.

Round-robin standings
Final round-robin standings

Playoffs

Women

Group A
The Group A competitions were contested in Stavanger.

Round-robin standings
Final round-robin standings

Sweden won the draw-to-the-button challenge and were given the third seed. Russia and Denmark played a tiebreaker game for the fourth seed.

Playoffs

Bronze-medal game
Saturday, November 30, 10:00

Final
Saturday, November 30, 10:00

Group B
The Group B competitions were contested in Stavanger.

Round-robin standings
Final round-robin standings

Playoffs

Bronze-medal game
Friday, November 29, 12:00

Final
Friday, November 29, 12:00

Group C
The Group C competitions were contested in Tårnby. Four women's teams competed for two berths to the Group B competitions in Stavanger. The teams played a double round robin, and at its conclusion, the top three teams advanced to the playoffs. Belarus and Slovenia advanced to the Group B competitions in Stavanger.

Round-robin standings
Final round-robin standings

Playoffs

References
General

Specific

External links

2013 in curling
European Curling Championships
2013 in Norwegian sport
International curling competitions hosted by Norway